John Burke may refer to:

Government and politics
 John mac Richard Mór Burke, 10th Clanricarde or Mac William Uachtar (d. 1536), Irish chieftain and noble
 John Burke, 9th Earl of Clanricarde (1642–1722), Irish soldier and peer
 John Smith de Burgh, 11th Earl of Clanricarde or John Smith Burke (1720–1782), Irish peer
 John Burke, Baron Leitrim or John "na Seamer" Burke or Seán mac an Iarla a Búrc, 1st Baron Leitrim (d. 1583), Irish noble
 Sir John Burke, 2nd Baronet (1782–1847), Irish soldier and MP for Galway County
John Burke (North Dakota politician) (1859–1937), 10th Governor of North Dakota and Treasurer of the United States
John Burke (Fairbanks), a 1963 bronze sculpture
John H. Burke (1894–1951), American lawyer, real estate broker, and politician
John Francis Burke (1923–2006), Canadian politician
John Burke (mayor) (born 1946), mayor of Porirua City New Zealand, 1983–1998
John R. Burke (1924–1993), U.S. ambassador to Guyana
John P. Burke (born 1954), American politician in Massachusetts
John Burke (Rhode Island politician), member of the Rhode Island Senate

Military
John Burke (spy) (1830–1871), Confederate spy in the American Civil War
John Burke (colonel) (1838–1914), officer in the Union Army during the American Civil War
John Oge Burke (d. 1601), Irish gentleman and soldier

Music
Johnny Burke (lyricist) (1908–1964), American songwriter
John Burke (composer) (1951–2020), Canadian composer
Johnny Burke (Newfoundland songwriter) (1851–1930), Newfoundland songwriter
Johnny Burke (Canadian singer) (died 2017), Canadian country singer
John Burke (American pianist) (born 1988), American composer & pianist

Sports
John Burke (1900s pitcher) (1877–1950), U.S. baseball player for the New York Giants
John Burke (1990s pitcher) (born 1970), U.S. baseball player for the Colorado Rockies and the University of Florida
John Burke (American football) (born 1971), played for the New England Patriots, New York Jets and San Diego Chargers
John Burke (footballer, fl. 1927–1935), Irish footballer from Tipperary
Johnny Burke (footballer) (1911–1987), Irish footballer
John Burke (footballer, born 1956), Irish footballer from Dublin
John Burke (footballer, born 1962), Scottish footballer for Exeter City and Chester City
John Burke (rugby league, born 1948) (1948–2013), rugby league footballer of the 1970s for Leeds, Keighley
John Burke (rugby league, born 1957), rugby league footballer of the 1970s for Wigan, and Workington Town
Jack Burke Sr. (John Burke, 1888–1943), American golfer
Jack Burke Jr. (John Burke, born 1923), American golfer

Others
John MacSeonin Burke, Archbishop of Tuam, 1441–1450
John J. Burke (1875–1936), Paulist priest and editor of the Catholic World
John Burke (genealogist) (1786–1848), Irish genealogist, founder of Burke's Peerage
Sir John Bernard Burke (1814–1892), British genealogist
John Edward Burke (1871–1947), shipowner in Queensland, Australia
John F. Burke (1922–2011), American medical researcher and co-inventor of synthetic skin in 1981
Arizona John Burke (1842–1917), American publicist, press agent and author
John P. Burke (unionist) (1884–1966), American labor unionist and socialist politician
John Burke (author) (1922–2011), English writer of novels and short stories
John Burke (artist) (1946–2006), Irish artist 
John Burke (photographer), 19th century British photographer
John M. Burke (born 2001), American chess player
John Burke, president of Trek Bicycle Corporation
SS John Burke, an American Liberty Ship destroyed in a kamikaze attack

See also
Jack Burke (disambiguation)
John Bourke (disambiguation)